Salvador Cabeza is a Spanish former professional tennis player.

Active on tour in the 1970s, Cabeza was a junior Sunshine Cup representative for Spain and a two-time winner of the Copa Sevilla. His best performance in a Grand Prix tournament came at the 1974 Madrid Open, where he had a win over world number 48 Vijay Amritraj, before falling to Vijay's brother Anand in the third round.

References

External links
 
 

Year of birth missing (living people)
Living people
Spanish male tennis players